Unni Kristiansen is a Norwegian former biathlete. She won a bronze medal in the team event at the Biathlon World Championships 1991, together with Synnøve Thoresen, Signe Trosten and Hildegunn Fossen.

References

External links

Year of birth missing (living people)
Living people
Norwegian female biathletes
Biathlon World Championships medalists
20th-century Norwegian women